

Events

Pre-1600
1060 – Béla I is crowned king of Hungary.
1240 – Mongol invasion of Rus': Kyiv, defended by Voivode Dmytro, falls to the Mongols under Batu Khan.
1492 – After exploring the island of Cuba for gold (which he had mistaken for Japan), Christopher Columbus lands on an island he names Hispaniola.
1534 – The city of Quito in Ecuador is founded by Spanish settlers led by Sebastián de Belalcázar.

1601–1900
1648 – Colonel Thomas Pride of the New Model Army purges the Long Parliament of MPs sympathetic to King Charles I of England, in order for the King's trial to go ahead; came to be known as "Pride's Purge".
1704 – Battle of Chamkaur: During the Mughal-Sikh Wars, an outnumbered Sikh Khalsa defeats a Mughal army.
1745 – Charles Edward Stuart's army begins retreat during the second Jacobite Rising.
1790 – The U.S. Congress moves from New York City to Philadelphia.
1803 – Five French warships attempting to escape the Royal Naval blockade of Saint-Domingue are all seized by British warships, signifying the end of the Haitian Revolution.
1865 – Georgia ratifies the 13th Amendment to the U.S. Constitution.
1882 – Transit of Venus, second and last of the 19th century.
1884 – The Washington Monument in Washington, D.C., is completed.
1897 – London becomes the world's first city to host licensed taxicabs.

1901–present
1904 – Theodore Roosevelt articulated his "Corollary" to the Monroe Doctrine, stating that the U.S. would intervene in the Western Hemisphere should Latin American governments prove incapable or unstable.
1907 – A coal mine explosion at Monongah, West Virginia, kills 362 workers.
1912 – The Nefertiti Bust is discovered.
1916 – World War I: The Central Powers capture Bucharest.
1917 – Finland declares independence from the Russian Empire.
  1917   – Halifax Explosion: A munitions explosion near Halifax, Nova Scotia kills more than 1,900 people in the largest artificial explosion up to that time.
  1917   – World War I:  is the first American destroyer to be sunk by enemy action when it is torpedoed by German submarine .
1921 – The Anglo-Irish Treaty is signed in London by British and Irish representatives.
1922 – One year to the day after the signing of the Anglo-Irish Treaty, the Irish Free State comes into existence.
1928 – The government of Colombia sends military forces to suppress a month-long strike by United Fruit Company workers, resulting in an unknown number of deaths.
1933 – U.S. federal judge John M. Woolsey rules that James Joyce's novel Ulysses is not obscene.
1941 – World War II:  Camp X opens in Canada to begin training Allied secret agents for the war.
1956 – A violent water polo match between Hungary and the USSR takes place during the 1956 Summer Olympics in Melbourne, against the backdrop of the Hungarian Revolution of 1956.
1957 – Project Vanguard: A launchpad explosion of Vanguard TV3 thwarts the first United States attempt to launch a satellite into Earth orbit.
1967 – Adrian Kantrowitz performs the first human heart transplant in the United States.
1969 – Altamont Free Concert: At a free concert performed by the Rolling Stones, eighteen-year old Meredith Hunter is stabbed to death by Hells Angels security guards.
1971 – Pakistan severs diplomatic relations with India, initiating the Indo-Pakistani War of 1971.
1973 – The Twenty-fifth Amendment: The United States House of Representatives votes 387–35 to confirm Gerald Ford as Vice President of the United States. (On November 27, the Senate confirmed him 92–3.)
1975 – The Troubles: Fleeing from the police, a Provisional IRA unit takes a British couple hostage in their flat on Balcombe Street, London, beginning a six-day siege.
1977 – South Africa grants independence to Bophuthatswana, although it is not recognized by any other country.
1978 – Spain ratifies the Spanish Constitution of 1978 in a referendum.
1982 – The Troubles: The Irish National Liberation Army bombs a pub frequented by British soldiers in Ballykelly, Northern Ireland, killing  eleven soldiers and six civilians.
1989 – The École Polytechnique massacre (or Montreal Massacre): Marc Lépine, an anti-feminist gunman, murders 14 young women at the École Polytechnique in Montreal.
1990 – A military jet of the Italian Air Force, abandoned by its pilot after an on-board fire, crashed into a high school near Bologna, Italy, killing 12 students and injuring 88 other people.
1991 – Yugoslav Wars: In Croatia, forces of the Serb-dominated Yugoslav People's Army (JNA) heaviest bombardment of Dubrovnik during a siege of seven months.
1992 – The Babri Masjid in Ayodhya, India, is demolished, leading to widespread riots causing the death of over 1,500 people.
1997 – A Russian Antonov An-124 Ruslan cargo plane crashes into an apartment complex near Irkutsk, Siberia, killing 67.
1998 – in Venezuela, Hugo Chávez is victorious in presidential elections.
1999 – A&M Records, Inc. v. Napster, Inc.: The Recording Industry Association of America sues the peer-to-peer file-sharing service Napster, alleging copyright infringement.
2005 – An Iranian Air Force C-130 military transport aircraft crashes into a ten-floor apartment building in a residential area of Tehran, killing all 94 on board and 12 more on the ground.
2006 – NASA reveals photographs taken by Mars Global Surveyor suggesting the presence of liquid water on Mars.
2015 – Venezuelan parliamentary election: For the first time in 17 years, the United Socialist Party of Venezuela loses its majority in parliament.
2017 – Donald Trump's administration officially announces the recognition of Jerusalem as the capital of Israel.

Births

Pre-1600
 846 – Hasan al-Askari, Arabian 11th of the Twelve Imams (d. 874)
1285 – Ferdinand IV of Castile (d. 1312)
1421 – Henry VI of England (d. 1471)
1478 – Baldassare Castiglione, Italian courtier, diplomat, and author (d. 1529)
1520 – Barbara Radziwiłł, queen of Poland (d. 1551)
1545 – Janus Dousa, Dutch historian and noble (d. 1604)
1586 – Niccolò Zucchi, Italian astronomer and physicist (d. 1670)
1592 – William Cavendish, 1st Duke of Newcastle (d. 1676)

1601–1900
1608 – George Monck, 1st Duke of Albemarle, English general and politician, Lord Lieutenant of Ireland (d. 1670)
1637 – Edmund Andros, English courtier and politician, 4th Colonial Governor of New York (d. 1714)
1640 – Claude Fleury, French historian and author (d. 1723)
1645 – Maria de Dominici, Maltese sculptor and painter (d. 1703)
1685 – Marie Adélaïde of Savoy (d. 1712)
1721 – Guillaume-Chrétien de Lamoignon de Malesherbes, French minister and politician (d. 1794)
  1721   – James Elphinston, Scottish philologist and linguist (d. 1809)
1732 – Warren Hastings, British colonial administrator of India (d. 1818)
1752 – Gabriel Duvall, American jurist and politician (d. 1844)
1778 – Joseph Louis Gay-Lussac, French physicist and chemist (d. 1850)
1792 – William II of the Netherlands (d. 1849)
1803 – Maria Josepha Amalia of Saxony (d. 1829)
1805 – Richard Hanson, English-Australian politician, 4th Premier of South Australia (d. 1876)
1812 – Robert Spear Hudson, English businessman and philanthropist (d. 1884)
1823 – Max Müller, German-English philologist and orientalist (d. 1900)
1827 – William Arnott, Australian biscuit manufacturer and founder of Arnott's Biscuits (d. 1901)
1833 – John S. Mosby, American colonel (d. 1916)
1835 – Wilhelm Rudolph Fittig, German chemist (d. 1910)
1841 – Frédéric Bazille, French painter and soldier (d. 1870)
1848 – Johann Palisa, Austrian astronomer (d. 1925)
1849 – August von Mackensen, German field marshal (d. 1945)
1853 – Hans Molisch, Czech-Austrian botanist and academic (d. 1937)
  1853   – Haraprasad Shastri, Indian historian and scholar (d. 1931)
1863 – Charles Martin Hall, American chemist and engineer (d. 1914)
1864 – William S. Hart, American actor, director, producer, and screenwriter (d. 1946)
1872 – Arthur Henry Adams, Australian journalist and author (d. 1936)
1875 – Albert Bond Lambert, American golfer and pilot (d. 1946)
  1875   – Evelyn Underhill, English mystic and author (d. 1941)
1876 – Fred Duesenberg, German-American businessman, co-founded the Duesenberg Automobile & Motors Company (d. 1932)
1878 – Elvia Carrillo Puerto, Mexican politician (d. 1968)
1882 – Warren Bardsley, Australian cricketer (d. 1954)
1884 – Cornelia Meigs, American author, playwright, and academic (d. 1973)
1886 – Joyce Kilmer, American soldier, author, and poet (d. 1918)
1887 – Lynn Fontanne, British actress (d. 1983)
  1887   – Joseph Lamb, American pianist and composer (d. 1960)
1888 – Will Hay, English actor, director, and screenwriter (d. 1949)
1890 – Dion Fortune, Welsh occultist, psychologist, and author (d. 1946)
  1890   – Yoshio Nishina, Japanese physicist and academic (d. 1951)
  1890   – Rudolf Schlichter, German painter and illustrator (d. 1955)
1892 – Osbert Sitwell, English-Italian captain, poet, and author (d. 1969)
1893 – Homer N. Wallin, American admiral (d. 1984)
  1893   – Sylvia Townsend Warner, English author and poet (d. 1978)
1896 – Ira Gershwin, American songwriter (d. 1983)
1898 – Alfred Eisenstaedt, German-American photographer and journalist (d. 1995)
  1898   – John McDonald, Scottish-Australian politician, 37th Premier of Victoria (d. 1977)
  1898   – Gunnar Myrdal, Swedish sociologist and economist, Nobel Prize laureate (d. 1987)
  1898   – Winifred Lenihan, American actress, writer, and director (d. 1964)
1900 – Agnes Moorehead, American actress (d. 1974)

1901–present
1901 – Eliot Porter, American photographer and academic (d. 1990)
1903 – Tony Lazzeri, American baseball player and manager (d. 1946)
1904 – Ève Curie, French-American journalist and pianist (d. 2007)
1905 – Elizabeth Yates, American journalist and author (d. 2001)
1907 – John Barkley Rosser Sr., American logician (d. 1989)
1908 – Pierre Graber, Swiss lawyer and politician, 69th President of the Swiss Confederation (d. 2003)
  1908   – Baby Face Nelson, American gangster (d. 1934)
  1908   – Miklós Szabó, Hungarian runner (d. 2000)
  1908   – Herta Freitag, Austrian-American mathematician (d. 2000)
1909 – Rulon Jeffs, American religious leader (d. 2002)
  1909   – Alan McGilvray, Australian cricketer and sportscaster (d. 1996)
1910 – David M. Potter, American historian, author, and academic (d. 1971)
1913 – Karl Haas, German-American pianist, conductor, and radio host (d. 2005)
  1913   – Eleanor Holm, American swimmer and actress (d. 2004)
1914 – Cyril Washbrook, English cricketer (d. 1999)
1916 – Yekaterina Budanova, Russian captain and pilot (d. 1943)
  1916   – Kristján Eldjárn, Icelandic educator and politician, 3rd President of Iceland (d. 1982)
  1916   – Hugo Peretti, American songwriter and producer (d. 1986)
1917 – Dean Hess, American minister and colonel (d. 2015)
  1917   – Kamal Jumblatt, Lebanese lawyer and politician (d. 1977)
  1917   – Irv Robbins, Canadian-American businessman, co-founded Baskin-Robbins (d. 2008)
1918 – Tauba Biterman, Polish Holocaust survivor (d. 2019)
1919 – Skippy Baxter, Canadian-American figure skater and coach (d. 2012)
  1919   – Paul de Man, Belgian-born philosopher, literary critic and theorist (d. 1983)
1920 – Dave Brubeck, American pianist and composer (d. 2012)
  1920   – Peter Dimmock, English sportscaster and producer (d. 2015)
  1920   – George Porter, English chemist and academic, Nobel Prize laureate (d. 2002)
1921 – Otto Graham, American football player and coach (d. 2003)
  1921   – Piero Piccioni, Italian lawyer, pianist, and composer (d. 2004)
1922 – John Brunt, English captain, Victoria Cross recipient (d. 1944)
  1922   – Benjamin A. Gilman, American soldier and politician (d. 2016)
1924 – Wally Cox, American actor (d. 1973)
1927 – Jim Fuchs, American shot putter and discus thrower (d. 2010)
1928 – Bobby Van, American actor, dancer, and singer (d. 1980)
1929 – Philippe Bouvard, French journalist and radio host
  1929   – Nikolaus Harnoncourt, German-Austrian cellist and conductor (d. 2016)
  1929   – Frank Springer, American comic book illustrator (d. 2009)
  1929   – Alain Tanner, Swiss director, producer, and screenwriter (d. 2022)
1930 – Daniel Lisulo, Zambian banker and politician, 3rd Prime Minister of Zambia (d. 2000)
1931 – Zeki Müren, Turkish singer-songwriter and actor (d. 1996)
1932 – Kamleshwar, Indian author, screenwriter, and critic (d. 2007)
1933 – Henryk Górecki, Polish composer and academic (d. 2010)
  1933   – Donald J. Kutyna, American general
1934 – Nick Bockwinkel, American wrestler, sportscaster, and actor (d. 2015)
1935 – Jean Lapointe, Canadian actor, singer, and politician (d. 2022)
1936 – Bill Ashton, English saxophonist and composer
  1936   – David Ossman, American writer and comedian
  1936   – Kenneth Copeland, American evangelist and author
1937 – Alberto Spencer, Ecuadorian-American soccer player (d. 2006)
1938 – Patrick Bauchau, Belgian-American actor
1939 – Franco Carraro, Italian politician and sports administrator
1940 – Lawrence Bergman, Canadian lawyer and politician
  1940   – Richard Edlund, American visual effects designer and cinematographer
1941 – Helen Cornelius, American country singer-songwriter and actress
  1941   – Richard Speck, American murderer (d. 1991)
  1941   – Bruce Nauman, American sculptor and illustrator
  1941   – Bill Thomas, American academic and politician
1942 – Peter Handke, Austrian author and playwright, Nobel Prize laureate
  1942   – Robb Royer, American guitarist, keyboard player, and songwriter 
1943 – Mike Smith, English singer-songwriter, keyboard player, and producer (d. 2008)
  1943   – Keith West, English rock singer-songwriter and music producer
1944 – Jonathan King, English singer-songwriter, record producer, music entrepreneur, television/radio presenter, and convicted sex offender
1945 – Shekhar Kapur, Indian director, producer, and screenwriter
1946 – Frankie Beverly, American soul/funk singer-songwriter, musician, and producer
  1946   – Willy van der Kuijlen, Dutch footballer and manager (d. 2021)
1947 – Lawrence Cannon, Canadian businessman and politician, 9th Canadian Minister of Foreign Affairs
  1947   – Henk van Woerden, Dutch-South African painter and author (d. 2005)
  1947   – Miroslav Vitouš, Czech-American bassist and songwriter 
1948 – Jean-Paul Ngoupandé, Central African politician, Prime Minister of the Central African Republic (d. 2014)
  1948   – Don Nickles, American businessman and politician
  1948   – Keke Rosberg, Finnish racing driver
  1948   – JoBeth Williams, American actress
1949 – Linda Barnes, American author, playwright, and educator
  1949   – Linda Creed, American singer-songwriter (d. 1986)
  1949   – Doug Marlette, American author and cartoonist (d. 2007)
  1949   – Peter Willey, English cricketer and umpire
1950 – Guy Drut, French hurdler and politician
  1950   – Joe Hisaishi, Japanese pianist, composer, and conductor
  1950   – Helen Liddell, Baroness Liddell of Coatdyke, Scottish journalist and politician, Secretary of State for Scotland
1951 – Wendy Ellis Somes, English ballerina and producer
  1951   – Maurice Hope, Caribbean-English boxer
1952 – Nicolas Bréhal, French author and critic (d. 1999)
  1952   – Craig Newmark, American computer programmer and entrepreneur; founded Craigslist
  1952   – Shio Satō, Japanese illustrator (d. 2010)
1953 – Sue Carroll, English journalist (d. 2011)
  1953   – Gary Goodman, Australian cricketer and coach
  1953   – Geoff Hoon, English academic and politician, Minister of State for Europe
  1953   – Tom Hulce, American actor 
  1953   – Masami Kurumada, Japanese author and illustrator
1954 – Nicola De Maria, Italian painter
  1954   – Chris Stamey, American singer-songwriter, musician, and music producer
1955 – Anne Begg, Scottish educator and politician
  1955   – Rick Buckler, English drummer, songwriter, and producer 
  1955   – Graeme Hughes, Australian cricketer, rugby league player, and sportscaster
  1955   – Tony Woodcock, English footballer
  1955   – Steven Wright, American actor, comedian, and screenwriter
1956 – Peter Buck, American guitarist, songwriter, and producer 
  1956   – Hans Kammerlander, Italian mountaineer and guide
  1956   – Randy Rhoads, American guitarist, songwriter, and producer (d. 1982)
1957 – Adrian Borland, English singer-songwriter, guitarist, and producer (d. 1999)
1958 – Nick Park, English animator, director, producer, and screenwriter
1959 – Stephen Hepburn, English politician
  1959   – Satoru Iwata, Japanese game programmer and businessman (d. 2015)
  1959   – Stephen Muggleton, English computer scientist and engineer
  1959   – Deborah Estrin, American computer scientist and academic
1960 – Masahiko Katsuya, Japanese journalist and photographer (d. 2018)
1961 – David Lovering, American drummer 
  1961   – Jonathan Melvoin, American musician (d. 1996)  
  1961   – Manuel Reuter, German race car driver
1962 – Ben Watt, English singer-songwriter, musician, author, DJ, and radio presenter
1963 – Ulrich Thomsen, Danish actor and producer
1964 – Mall Nukke, Estonian painter
1965 – Gordon Durie, Scottish footballer and manager
1966 – Natascha Badmann, Swiss triathlete
  1966   – Per-Ulrik Johansson, Swedish golfer
1967 – Judd Apatow, American director, producer, and screenwriter
  1967   – Arnaldo Mesa, Cuban boxer (d. 2012)
  1967   – Helen Greiner, American businesswoman and engineer
1968 – Akihiro Yano, Japanese baseball player
1968 - Ali Latifiyan, An Iranian writer and political theorist.
1969 – Torri Higginson, Canadian actress
1970 – Ulf Ekberg, Swedish singer-songwriter, keyboard player, and producer 
  1970   – Adrian Fenty, American lawyer and politician, 6th Mayor of the District of Columbia
  1970   – Mark Reckless, English politician
  1970   – Jeff Rouse, American swimmer
1971 – Craig Brewer, American director, producer, and screenwriter
  1971   – Richard Krajicek, Dutch tennis player
  1971   – Naozumi Takahashi, Japanese singer and voice actor
  1971   – Carole Thate, Dutch field hockey player
1972 – Ewan Birney, English scientist
  1972   – Heather Mizeur, American lawyer and politician
  1972   – Rick Short, American baseball player
1974 – Jens Pulver, American mixed martial artist and boxer
  1974   – Nick Stajduhar, Canadian ice hockey player
1975 – Noel Clarke, English actor, director, and screenwriter
  1975   – Adrian García Arias, Mexican footballer 
1977 – Kevin Cash, American baseball player and coach
  1977   – Andrew Flintoff, English cricketer, coach, and sportscaster
  1977   – Paul McVeigh, Irish footballer
1978 – Chris Başak, American baseball player
  1978   – Darrell Jackson, American football player
  1978   – Ramiro Pez, Argentine rugby player
1979 – Tim Cahill, Australian footballer
1980 – Danielle Downey, American golfer and coach (d. 2014)
  1980   – Steve Lovell, English footballer
  1980   – Carlos Takam, Cameroonian-French boxer
1981 – Federico Balzaretti, Italian footballer
  1982   – Robbie Gould, American football player
1982 – Ryan Carnes, American actor and producer
  1982   – Alberto Contador, Spanish cyclist
  1982   – Sean Ervine, Zimbabwean cricketer
  1982   – Aaron Sandilands, Australian footballer
  1982   – Susie Wolff, Scottish race car driver
1984 – Syndric Steptoe, American football player
  1984   – Nora Kirkpatrick, American actress and musician
  1984   – Princess Sofia, Duchess of Värmland
1985 – Shannon Bobbitt, American basketball player
  1985   – Aristeidis Grigoriadis, Greek swimmer
  1985   – Rudra Pratap Singh, Indian cricketer
1986 – Sean Edwards, English race car driver (d. 2013)
  1986   – Matt Niskanen, American ice hockey player
1988 – Adam Eaton, American baseball player
  1988   – Sandra Nurmsalu, Estonian singer and violinist 
  1988   – Nils Petersen, German footballer
  1988   – Nobunaga Shimazaki, Japanese voice actor
  1988   – Ravindra Jadeja, Indian cricketer
1989 – Felix Schiller, German footballer
1990 – Tamira Paszek, Austrian tennis player
1991 – Milica Mandić, Serbian taekwondo athlete, two-time Olympic champion
  1991   – Coco Vandeweghe, American tennis player
1992 – Britt Assombalonga, Congolese footballer
  1992   – Johnny Manziel, American football player
1993 – Jasprit Bumrah, Indian cricketer 
  1993   – Elián González, Cuban technician, known for a child custody and immigration case held in 2000
  1993   – Pedro Rafael Amado Mendes, Portuguese footballer
  1993   – Tautau Moga, Australian-Samoan rugby league player
1994 – Giannis Antetokounmpo, Greek basketball player
  1994   – Shreyas Iyer, Indian cricketer
  1994   – Wakatakakage Atsushi, Japanese sumo wrestler
1996 – Davide Calabria, Italian football player
1998 – Angelīna Kučvaļska, Latvian figure skater

Deaths

Pre-1600
 343 – Saint Nicholas, Greek bishop and saint (b. 270)
 735 – Prince Toneri of Japan (b. 676)
 762 – Muhammad al-Nafs al-Zakiyya, Arab rebel leader (b. 710)
1185 – Afonso I of Portugal (b. 1109)
1305 – Maximus, Metropolitan of Kyiv
1306 – Roger Bigod, 5th Earl of Norfolk (b. 1270)
1352 – Pope Clement VI (b. 1291)
1562 – Jan van Scorel, Dutch painter (b. 1495)

1601–1900
1616 – Ahmad Ibn al-Qadi, Moroccan writer, judge and mathematician (b. 1552)
1618 – Jacques Davy Duperron, French cardinal (b. 1556)
1658 – Baltasar Gracián, Spanish priest and author (b. 1601)
1675 – John Lightfoot, English priest, scholar, and academic (b. 1602)
1686 – Eleonora Gonzaga, Queen consort of Ferdinand III (b. 1630)
1716 – Benedictus Buns, Dutch priest and composer (b. 1642)
1718 – Nicholas Rowe, English poet and playwright (b. 1674)
1746 – Lady Grizel Baillie, Scottish poet and songwriter (b. 1665)
1771 – Giovanni Battista Morgagni, Italian anatomist and pathologist (b. 1682)
1779 – Jean-Baptiste-Siméon Chardin, French painter (b. 1699)
1788 – Jonathan Shipley, English bishop (b. 1714)
1855 – William John Swainson, English ornithologist and entomologist (b. 1789)
1867 – Jean Pierre Flourens, French physiologist and academic (b. 1794)
1868 – August Schleicher, German linguist and academic (b. 1821)
1878 – Theodoros Vryzakis, Greek painter and educator (b. 1814)
1879 – Erastus Brigham Bigelow, American businessman (b. 1814)
1882 – Alfred Escher, Swiss businessman and politician, founded Credit Suisse (b. 1819)
  1882   – Anthony Trollope, English novelist, essayist, and short story writer  (b. 1815)
1889 – Jefferson Davis, American general and politician, President of the Confederate States of America (b. 1808)
1892 – Werner von Siemens, German engineer and businessman, founded the Siemens Company (b. 1816)

1901–present
1918 – Alexander Dianin, Russian chemist (b. 1851) 
1921 – Said Halim Pasha, Ottoman politician, 280th Grand Vizier of the Ottoman Empire (b. 1865)
1924 – Gene Stratton-Porter, American author and screenwriter (b. 1863)
1945 – Edmund Dwyer-Gray, Irish-Australian politician, 29th Premier of Tasmania (b. 1870)
1951 – Harold Ross, American journalist and publisher, founded The New Yorker (b. 1892)
1955 – Honus Wagner, American baseball player and manager (b. 1874)
1956 – B. R. Ambedkar, Indian economist and politician, 1st Indian Minister of Justice (b. 1891)
1961 – Frantz Fanon, Martinique-French psychiatrist and author (b. 1925)
1964 – Evert van Linge, Dutch footballer and architect (b. 1895)
1972 – Janet Munro, English actress and singer (b. 1934)
1974 – Nikolay Kuznetsov, Soviet naval officer (b. 1904)
1976 – João Goulart, Brazilian lawyer and politician, 24th President of Brazil (b. 1918)
1980 – Charles Deutsch, French engineer and businessman, co-founded DB (b. 1911) 
1982 – Jean-Marie Seroney, Kenyan activist and politician (b. 1927)
1983 – Lucienne Boyer, French singer and actress (b. 1903)
  1983   – Gul Khan Nasir, Pakistani poet, historian, and politician (b. 1914)
1985 – Burr Tillstrom, American actor and puppeteer (b. 1917)
  1985   – Burleigh Grimes, American baseball player and manager (b. 1893)
1988 – Roy Orbison, American singer-songwriter and guitarist (b. 1936)
1989 – Frances Bavier, American actress (b. 1902)
  1989   – Sammy Fain, American pianist and composer (b. 1902)
  1989   – John Payne, American actor, singer, and producer (b. 1912)
1990 – Pavlos Sidiropoulos, Greek singer-songwriter and guitarist (b. 1948)
  1990   – Tunku Abdul Rahman, Malaysian lawyer and politician, 1st Prime Minister of Malaysia (b. 1903)
1991 – Mimi Smith, English nurse (b. 1906)
  1991   – Richard Stone, English economist and statistician, Nobel Prize laureate (b. 1913)
1993 – Don Ameche, American actor (b. 1908)
1994 – Heinz Baas, German footballer and manager (b. 1922)
  1994   – Gian Maria Volonté, Italian actor and director (b. 1933)
1996 – Pete Rozelle, American businessman (b. 1926)
1997 – Willy den Ouden, Dutch swimmer (b. 1918)
1998 – César Baldaccini, French sculptor and educator (b. 1921)
2000 – Werner Klemperer, German-American actor (b. 1920)
  2000   – Aziz Mian, Pakistani singer-songwriter and poet (b. 1942)
2001 – Charles McClendon, American football player and coach (b. 1923)
2002 – Philip Berrigan, American priest and activist (b. 1923)
2003 – Carlos Manuel Arana Osorio, Guatemalan general and politician, President of Guatemala (b. 1918)
2005 – Charly Gaul, Luxembourger cyclist (b. 1932)
  2005   – Devan Nair, Malaysian-Singaporean union leader and politician, 3rd President of Singapore (b. 1923)
  2005   – Danny Williams, South African singer (b. 1942)
  2005   – William P. Yarborough, American general (b. 1912)
2006 – John Feeney, New Zealand director and producer (b. 1922)
2010 – Mark Dailey, American-Canadian journalist and actor (b. 1953)
2011 – Dobie Gray, American singer-songwriter and producer (b. 1940)
2012 – Miguel Abia Biteo Boricó, Equatoguinean engineer and politician, Prime Minister of Equatorial Guinea (b. 1961)
  2012   – Jan Carew, Guyanese author, poet, and playwright (b. 1920)
  2012   – Jeffrey Koo Sr., Taiwanese banker and businessman (b. 1933)
  2012   – Huw Lloyd-Langton, English guitarist (b. 1951)
  2012   – Pedro Vaz, Uruguayan lawyer and politician, Minister of Foreign Affairs of Uruguay (b. 1963)
2013 – Jean-Pierre Desthuilliers, French poet and critic (b. 1939)
  2013   – Stan Tracey, English pianist and composer (b. 1926)
  2013   – M. K. Turk, American basketball player and coach (b. 1942)
2014 – Ralph H. Baer, German-American video game designer, created the Magnavox Odyssey (b. 1922)
  2014   – Jimmy Del Ray, American wrestler and manager (b. 1962)
  2014   – Fred Hawkins, American golfer (b. 1923)
  2014   – Luke Somers, English-American photographer and journalist (b. 1981)
2015 – Ko Chun-hsiung, Taiwanese actor, director, and politician (b. 1945)
  2015   – Liu Juying, Chinese general and politician (b. 1917)
  2015   – Nicholas Smith, British actor (b. 1934)
2016 – Peter Vaughan, British actor (b. 1923)

Holidays and observances
 Anniversary of the Founding of Quito (Ecuador)
 Armed Forces Day (Ukraine) 
 Christian feast day:
 Abraham of Kratia
 Aemilianus (Roman Catholic Church)
 Denise and companions
Blessed János Scheffler
 María del Monte Carmelo Sallés y Barangueras
 Nicholas of Myra, and its related observances:
 St Nicholas Day, where St. Nicholas/Santa Claus leaves little presents in children's shoes. (International)
 December 6 (Eastern Orthodox liturgics)
 Constitution Day (Spain)
 Day of the Ministry of Communications and Information Technologies of Azerbaijan
 Independence Day, celebrates the independence of Finland from Russia in 1917.
 National Day of Remembrance and Action on Violence Against Women (Canada)

References

External links

 BBC: On This Day
 
 Historical Events on December 6

Days of the year
December